Dinesh Debbarma (1918, Salema – 28 November 2007, Agartala) was a communist politician from the Indian state of Tripura. Debbarma first represented the party while standing in the 1977 Tripura Legislative Assembly elections. He won election three consecutive times from 1977 to 1993. He was minister for two terms in 1978 and 1983.

Career 
Debbarma was born in a most backward tribal village at Maharani of Kamalpur sub-division. He was plunged into Janasiksha Movement initiated by Dasarath Deb during king's rule. In 1950 he became a member of Communist Party of India, he was the state council member of the party since its formation in the state. He was one of the founder members of Tripura Rajya Upajati Ganamukti Parishad in 1948. In the 1964 split in the party, he sided with the Communist Party of India (Marxist). He was the state committee member of the CPI(M) till his death. He was minister for Panchayat and Rural Development during the first Left Front government in Tripura, during his period first-ever Panchayat elections in the secret ballot was held in the state. He spent underground for more than six years.

See also 
 Dasarath Deb
 Tripura Janasiksha Samiti
 Ganamukti Parishad

References 

Tripura politicians
Communist Party of India (Marxist) politicians from Tripura
1918 births
2007 deaths
People from Tripura
Tripuri people
People from Dhalai district
Tripura MLAs 1977–1983
Tripura MLAs 1983–1988